State leaders in the 17th century BC – State leaders in the 15th century BC – State leaders by year
This is a list of state leaders in the 16th century BC (1600–1501 BC).

Africa: Northeast

Egypt: Second Intermediate Period

Fifteenth Dynasty of the Second Intermediate Period (complete list) –
Khyan, King (c.1610–1580 BC)
Apepi, King (c.1575–1540 BC)
Khamudi, King (c.1540 BC)

Sixteenth Dynasty of the Theban region in Upper Egypt: Second Intermediate Period (complete list) –
Nebiriau II, King (c.1600 BC)
Semenre, King (c.1600 BC)
Bebiankh, King (c.1600–1588 BC)
Sekhemre Shedwast, King (early-16th century BC)
Dedumose I, King (c.1590 BC)
Dedumose II, King (c.1590 BC)
Djedankhre Montemsaf, King (c.1590 BC)
Merankhre Mentuhotep, King (c.1585 BC)
Senusret IV, King (early-16th century BC)
Pepi III, King (uncertain chronological position)

Seventeenth Dynasty of the Second Intermediate Period (complete list) –
Rahotep, King (1580–1576 BC)
Nebmaatre, King (1570s BC)
Sobekemsaf I, King (1570s BC)
Sobekemsaf II, King (1570s BC)
Sekhemre-Wepmaat Intef, King (c.1573–c.1571 BC)
Nubkheperre Intef, King (c.1571–1560s BC)
Sekhemre-Heruhirmaat Intef, King (1560s BC)
Senakhtenre Ahmose, King (1559–1558 BC)
Seqenenre Tao, King (c.1560/1558–c.1554 BC)
Kamose, King (c.1555–1550/1549 BC)

Egypt: New Kingdom

Eighteenth Dynasty of the New Kingdom (complete list) –
Ahmose I, King (1550–1525 BC)
Amenhotep I, King (1525–1504 BC)
Thutmose I, King (1506–1493 BC)

Asia

Asia: East

China

Shang, China (complete list) –
Tai Jia, King (c.1602–1590 BC)
Bu Bing, King (c.1590–1588 BC)
Tai Geng, King (c.1588–1563 BC)
Xiao Jia, King (c.1563–1546 BC)
Tai Wu, King (c.1546–1471 BC)

Asia: Southeast
Vietnam
Hồng Bàng dynasty (complete list) –
Khôn line, (c.1632–c.1431 BC)

Asia: West

Hittite Empire: Old Kingdom complete list) –
Zidanta I, King (c.1560–1550 BC])
Ammuna, King (c.1550–1530 BC)
Telepinu, King (1525–1500 BC)

Tyre, Phoenecia (complete list) –
Agenor, King (c.1500 BC)

Assyria: Old Period (complete list) –
Sharma-Adad II, King (1601–1598 BC)
Erishum III, King (1598–1586 BC, traditional date, c.1580–1567 BC, newer dating)
Shamshi-Adad II, King (1567–1561 BC)
Ishme-Dagan II, King (1561–1545 BC)
Shamshi-Adad III, King (1545–1529 BC)
Puzur-Ashur III, King (1521–1498 BC)

First Dynasty of Babylon (complete list) –
Ammi-Ditana, King (1620–1583 BC)
Ammi-Saduqa, King (1582–1562 BC)
Samsu-Ditana, King (1562–1531 BC)
Agum II, Kassites, ruler (c.1507 BC)

Elam (complete list) –
Shirtuh
Kuduzulush II
Sukkalmah & King of Susa
Tan-Uli
Sukkalmah & Sukkal
Temti-Halki
Sukkalmah & Sukkal of Elam and Simashki and Susa
Kuk-Nashur IV
Sukkalmah
Kutik-Matlat
Sukkalmah, ruler (c.1500 BC)

Europe: Balkans

Athens —
Cecrops I, legendary King (1556–1506 BC)
Cranaus, legendary King (1506–1497 BC)

References 

State Leaders
-
16th-century BC rulers